Birchgrove Rugby Football Club is a rugby union team from the village of Birchgrove in Swansea, Wales. The club is a member of the Welsh Rugby Union and is a feeder club for the Ospreys.

Birchgrove RFC fields a senior and youth team that often combine as a senior team.

Club honours
WRU Division Four South West 2009/10 - Champions

Youth Rugby
Birchgrove RFC Youth Team reformed in the 2012–13 season with former First Team player Conrad Beynon coaching. They are currently playing in WRU Osprey OE League. Their captain is scrum half Leigh Di'Iulio.

References

Welsh rugby union teams
Rugby union in Swansea